Altoona High School is a public high school located in Altoona, Wisconsin. It serves students in grades 9 through 12 and is the only high school in the Altoona School District.

History
Although elementary education had been provided for Altoona residents since the late nineteenth century, a public high school was not opened until October 1913. The original building burned down in 1951, and a successful February 1952 referendum authorized a new building, which opened in October of that year. A 1981 referendum to address overcrowding by building a new high school failed, but a 1986 referendum for a new building passed.

Demographics
The school's student population is 86 percent white, five percent Hispanic, two percent Asian, and two percent black. Four percent of students identify as a part of two or more races. 28 percent of students qualify for free or reduced lunch.

Academics
Advanced Placement classes are offered at Altoona; just under half of students take an AP class.

Athletics
AHS athletic teams are known as the Railroaders and compete in the Cloverbelt Conference. In the fall of 2019, a new sports complex with artificial turf opened, housing contests for the football, soccer, and track and field. The football field is named after former Green Bay Packers player Fuzzy Thurston, a graduate of the school.

Performing arts
Altoona High has a competitive show choir. The group was originally named "Northland Singers", but is now known as "Locomotion". At times, the school also had a jayvee-level group, "Enginuity". The school has hosted its own competition, "Locopalooza", annually since 2000.

Notable alumni
 Leonard Haas, former chancellor of University of Wisconsin–Eau Claire
 Tod Ohnstad, member of the Wisconsin State Assembly
 Fuzzy Thurston, Green Bay Packers Hall of Fame member

References

High schools in Wisconsin
1913 establishments in Wisconsin
Educational institutions established in 1913
Schools in Eau Claire County, Wisconsin